Girl Out of the Ordinary is the first studio album by Beverley Mahood which was released in 1998. The title track was released to country radio in 1997 and was later followed by the singles "A Little Thing Called Love" (1997), "Let's Kiss and Make Up", "Radio 101" (1998), "I Love How You Listen to Me" and "The Way a Woman Feels" (1999).

Track listing
"Radio 101" (Beverley Mahood, Gary O'Connor) – 3:17
"Girl Out of the Ordinary" (Mark Dineen, Mahood) – 4:02
"True Love (Never Goes Out of Style)" (Dineen, Mahood) – 4:21
"A Little Thing Called Love" (Ron Hiller, J. Richard Hutt, Mahood, Judy Millar) – 3:26
"The Way I Woman Feels" (Dineen, Hutt, Mahood) – 3:57
"I Believe in You" (O'Connor) – 4:20
"I Don't Do" (Hiller, Hutt, Mahood, Millar) – 4:08
"Let's Kiss and Make Up" (Dineen, Steve Hogg, Mahood) – 4:18
with Ken Munshaw
"Moving Day" (Hiller, Mahood, Millar) – 5:18
"Little Miss Innocent" (Hogg, Mahood) – 4:14
"I Love How You Listen to Me" (Hiller, Mahood, Millar) – 3:13
"All Through the Night" (Traditional) – 3:11
bonus track

1998 debut albums
Beverley Mahood albums